Sir Aubrey Edward Henry Dean Paul, 5th Baronet (19 October 1869 – 16 January 1961) was a captain in the Northumberland Fusiliers and a descendant of the 1st Duke of Marlborough,

Life
A descendant of Sir John Dean Paul, 1st Baronet (1775–1852), he was fifth of the Paul Baronets, of Rodborough, and father of Brenda Dean Paul, one of the ‘bright young things’.

In 1901, he married Irene Regina, daughter of Henry Wieniawski and Isabelle Bessie-Hampton. The couple had been introduced by Nellie Melba. Lady Dean Paul, now adopted British nationality, but continued to publish works as "Irène Wieniawska". They had two other children:
 Aubrey Donald Fitzwarren Severin Dean Paul (1902–1904)
 Sir Brian Kenneth Dean Paul, 6th Baronet Paul of Rodborough (18 May 1904 – 5 August 1972)

Religion
The 5th Baronet converted to Roman Catholicism in 1914 and the couple's daughter was educated at convent schools. His wife maintained a Bohemian lifestyle and the couple separated in 1922.

References

Baronets in the Baronetage of the United Kingdom
1869 births
1961 deaths